Policheta is a genus of flies in the family Tachinidae.

Species
Policheta crassispinosa Wood, 1985
Policheta unicolor (Fallén, 1820)

References

Diptera of Europe
Diptera of North America
Exoristinae
Tachinidae genera
Taxa named by Camillo Rondani